Rose City Radio Corporation was the owner of two radio stations in Portland, Oregon, NewsRadio 750 KXL and KXTG-FM 95.5 The Game, until those stations were sold to Alpha Broadcasting. Rose City also owns the Radio Northwest Network which airs programming on KXL to 17 affiliates throughout Oregon. Featured programming includes the Lars Larson show, Around the House, In the Garden, Mr Barbeque and NW Vine Time. All the shows are locally produced by Rose City Radio and focus on Oregon issues and trends.

Rose City also owned Sporting News radio stations in Boston, Massachusetts (WWZN 1510 AM — The Zone) and Los Angeles, California (KMPC 1540 AM — The Ticket) and the former Sporting News Radio station WSNR (620 AM) in Jersey City, New Jersey, until selling those two stations to Blackstrap Broadcasting in 2007.

Rose City is owned by Microsoft co-founder and Portland Trail Blazers owner Paul Allen.

Companies based in Portland, Oregon
Mass media in Portland, Oregon